It is a fort located in malegaon taluka
Galna was a major fort in the south Khandesh area of Maharashtra, India. This fort was an important fort on the Burhanpur -Surat trade route. This is one of the forts in Maharashtra with the bastion and the entrance in good condition. This fort is located on hills between Malegaon and Dhule.

How to reach
This fort is located in Malegaon taluka of Nashik district. The base village Galna is well connected by motorable road to Malegaon and Dhule. Regular buses ply from Malegaon to Dongarale village. Dongarale village is 30-15 km from Malegaon as well as Dhule. Dongarale to Galna distance is 4 km.

History
Galna was an important place at the end of the fifteenth century. It lay on the border of the Deccan. It was held by the Maratha when about in 1487, two brothers Malik Wuji and Malik Ashraf, the Governors of Daulatabad took it and held for some time. In 1506 after the murder of Malik Wauji the fort was under the control of Malik Ahmed Shah Nizam of Ahmadnagar. On the death of Malik Ahmed Shah Nizam of Ahmadnagar on 1510 again the fort was passed to Musalman chief who denied to pay tributes to Maratha chief. In 1634 Muhammad khan, the Musalman commandant of Galna  delivered their tributes to Moghuls. It was attacked by Aurangzeb in 1704 and captured in 1705. In December 1804 this fort was taken from Holkars by Captain Wallace. Finally, in March 1818 it was occupied by native Infantry. For a few year after 1818, a mamlatdar held an office in Galna.

References

See also
List of forts in Maharashtra
Khandesh
Nashik
Shivaji

Forts in Maharashtra
Tourist attractions in Dhule district
Forts in Nashik district
16th-century forts in India
Buildings and structures of the Maratha Empire